Dakshinamurthy is supreme guru of Lord Shiva.

Dakshinamurthy Stotram, a stotra in praise of Dakshinamurthy

People
 Dakshinamurthy Pillai (1875–1936), Carnatic musician
 A. Dakshinamurthy, Tamil scholar
 V. Dakshinamoorthy (1919–2013), veteran Carnatic musician and South Indian music director
 Sonti Dakshinamurthy (1899–1975), famous professor of Medicine
 M. Karunanidhi, whose original birth name  is Dakshinamurthy